Selangor Council of the Royal Court, established in 1959, serves as an advisory council to the head of Selangor state government, Sultan Sharafuddin Idris Shah Al-Haj. There are 22 members of the council, which is made up of Selangor royal family members and Selangor state officers.

Members 
Chairman: Sultan Sharafuddin Idris Shah Al-Haj

Ex-officio:

 Crown Prince of Selangor - Tengku Amir Shah Ibni Sultan Sharafuddin Idris Shah
 Tengku Bendahara Selangor - vacant
 Tengku Laksamana Selangor - Tengku Sulaiman Shah Ibni Almarhum Sultan Salahuddin Abdul Aziz Shah
 Menteri Besar Selangor - Datuk Seri Amirudin Shari
 MAIS Chairman - Datuk Mohamad Adzib Mohd Isa
 Mufti Selangor - Datuk Mohd Tamyes Abd Wahid

The Other Heirs：

 Tengku Aris Temenggong Selangor - vacant
 Tengku Panglima Besar Selangor - Tengku Abdul Samad Shah Ibni Almarhum Sultan Salahuddin Abdul Aziz Shah Al Haj
 Tengku Panglima Raja Selangor - Tengku Ahmad Shah Ibni Almarhum Sultan Salahuddin Abdul Aziz Shah Al Haj
 Tengku Indera Pahlawan Diraja Selangor - Tengku Dato' Setia Putra Alhaj Ibni Almarhum Tengku Bendahara Azman Shah Al Haj

District Chieftains：

 Tengku Seri Wangsa Diraja - Tengku Datuk Ramli bin Tengku Sri Andika Diraja Sharuddin Shah
 Engku Setia Lela Bestari - Raja Tan Sri Arshad bin Raja Sir Tun Uda
 Datuk Orang Kaya Maha Bijaya Gombak - Dato' Paduka Raja Tan Sri Wan Mahmood bin Pa’wan Teh
 Datuk Jugra Kurnia Diraja - Tan Sri Syed Mohd Yusof bin Tun Syed Nasir
 Datuk Salehuddin Saidin

The elders ：

 Datuk Abdul Halim bin Datuk Abdul Rauf
 Tan Sri Ambrin Buang
 General Tan Sri Mohd Hashim bin Mohd Ali
 Tan Sri Ismail bin Adam
 Datuk Ramli bin Mahmud
 Datuk Mohammad Khusrin bin Munawi

Source:

Issues and news 
On 6 May 2008, DAP chairman, Karpal Singh in the newspaper The Malay Mail was reported to accuse the Sultan of Selangor had interfered with the affairs of Selangor state executives. On 13 Mei 2008, Selangor Council of the Royal Court releases a statement refuting the accusation, saying that the Sultan has the right to give his views, advise and warn the state government on the affairs of the people in accordance to the state constitution.

On 13 March 2018, the council states that they never issued an offer letter for the decoration of Selangor to a person named Goh Boon Leong and a police report has been lodged regarding the forged letter.

References 

Selangor
1959 establishments in Malaya
Organizations established in 1959
Non-profit organisations based in Malaysia